Wadham may refer to:

Education
 Wadham College, Oxford – a constituent college of the University of Oxford
 Wadham College Boat Club – the rowing club of Wadham College, Oxford
 Wadham School – a school for children near Crewkerne, Somerset, England
 Wadham Preparatory School – a primary school for children formerly in Strathfield, New South Wales, Australia

Places
 Wadham Islands – a group of islands near Newfoundland, Canada
 Offer Wadham Lighthouse

Companies
 Wadham's Oil and Grease Company of Milwaukee

See also
 Wadhams, Kimball Township, Michigan
 Wadhams, Westport, New York
 People with the surname Wadham or Wadhams
 People of the name Wadham Wyndham